Per Møystad Backe (2 December 1914 – 19 August 1991) was a Norwegian jurist and industrial leader. He was born in Hammerfest. He was a central person in the development of the Scandinavian Airlines from 1946. From 1959 to 1968 he was manager of Dalen Portland Cementfabrik. He chaired the board of Norcem from 1968 to 1983, as well as Viking–Askim from 1970. He was decorated Knight, First Class of the Order of St. Olav in 1971.

References

1914 births
1991 deaths
People from Hammerfest
Norwegian expatriates in France
20th-century Norwegian businesspeople
Norwegian resistance members
SAS Group people